David Safaryan (born 1 August 1989) is an Armenian and Russian Freestyle wrestler and World and European Champion.

Biography
Safaryan was born on 1 August 1989 in Cherkessk, Russia. He began wrestling since childhood in his father's initiative, who had the title of Master of Sports in wrestling. Since 2003, he trained in Krasnodar under Abdulla Magomedov. From 2006 to 2009, he was a member of the cadet and junior national team of Russia, becoming a Cadet European Champion in 2006 and 2007 and a Junior World Championships silver medalist in 2009.

Later, Safaryan decided to compete for Armenia, where he began to train under the head coach of the Armenian freestyle wrestling team Araik Baghdadyan. His first success at the senior international level came when he won a bronze medal at the 2012 European Wrestling Championships. Shortly thereafter, he competed at the 2012 Summer Olympics in London, but was unable to win a medal due to controversial refereeing while facing Kazakh Akzhurek Tanatarov in the quarterfinals, amid a number of other controversial Kazakhstan victories.

He won a gold medal at the 2013 European Wrestling Championships in Tbilisi. Safaryan is the first Armenian to become a European Champion in freestyle wrestling in nine years. Prime Minister of Georgia Bidzina Ivanishvili came up and congratulated David afterwards. At the 2013 Summer Universiade in Kazan, he won a silver medal. Later that year Safaryan also won the gold medal at the 2013 World Wrestling Championships in Budapest, taking revenge on Tanatarov in the quarterfinals and defeating Cuban Liván López, another 2012 Olympic medalist, in the finals. Safaryan was named the Armenian Athlete of the Year for 2013 by vote conducted by the Republican Federation of Sports Journalists of Armenia.

He also competed at the 2016 Summer Olympics.

References

External links
 
 

1989 births
Living people
People from Cherkessk
Armenian male sport wrestlers
Olympic wrestlers of Armenia
Wrestlers at the 2012 Summer Olympics
Russian people of Armenian descent
European Games competitors for Armenia
Wrestlers at the 2015 European Games
World Wrestling Championships medalists
Universiade medalists in wrestling
Wrestlers at the 2016 Summer Olympics
Universiade silver medalists for Armenia
European Wrestling Championships medalists
Medalists at the 2013 Summer Universiade